Kings Area Regional Transit (KART, previously Kings Area Rural Transit) is the primary bus service serving residents and visitors to the cities of Avenal, Hanford, and Lemoore in Kings County, California. KART is the branded service operated by the Kings County Area Public Transit Agency (KCAPTA) since June 1980; KCAPTA has contracted with MV Transportation to provide operations and maintenance for KART. It provides both intracity routes within and intercity routes between those three cities; in addition, it provides routes serving rural communities within Kings County as well as commuter routes connecting to Fresno Area Express in Fresno and Visalia Transit in Visalia.

History
The Kings County Area Public Transit Agency is a joint powers agency that began operations in June 1980, formed by the four cities of Avenal, Cororan, Hanford, and Lemoore in partnership with the County of Kings. The City of Corcoran withdrew from KCAPTA two years later. On July 5, 2005, KCAPTA became a separate public entity; prior to that time, KCAPTA was part of the county government.

KCAPTA also was responsible for operating vanpool programs in Kings County between 2001 and 2012. The vanpool programs were transferred to a new joint powers agency, CalVans in 2012.

Structure
KCAPTA is governed by a five-person board of directors, consisting of two members appointed from the Kings County Board of Supervisors, and one member each from the three cities.

Routes and services 
KART operates ten local fixed routes (Routes 1–9 in Hanford and Route 20 in Lemoore) and five out-of-town routes (Routes 12, 13, 14, 15, and 17), connecting Hanford with Avenal, Corcoran, Laton, Visalia, and Fresno, respectively.

All routes start and end at the Hanford Transit Center, also known as the KART Transfer Center.

In addition to its fixed routes, KART operates paratransit services in Hanford, Lemoore, and Armona, providing service to and from destinations within  of existing fixed route services. Flex routes are provided in the same cities during weekdays.

Fares 
No change is provided on board the bus.

Notes

Fleet and facilities
Buses operate primarily from the KART Transfer Center; in addition, KCAPTA has an Administrative Office and KART Maintenance Facility. The existing Transfer Center has 10 bus bays; the Administrative Office is near the Transfer Center on 7th Street in downtown Hanford, and buses enter the site on 8th. Bus operators are provided by MV Transportation.

The new transit center is scheduled to open in 2024. KCAPTA officials presented preliminary designs by RRM Design Group, based in San Luis Obispo, to the Hanford City Council in February 2022.

References

External links
 

Public transportation in Kings County, California
Public transportation in the San Joaquin Valley Area
Bus transportation in California